Reinshagen may refer to:

People

Gerlind Reinshagen (1926–2019), German writer

Places in Germany

 a district of the town Remscheid in North Rhine-Westphalia
 a district of the municipality Lalendorf in the Landkreis Rostock in Mecklenburg-Vorpommern
 a district of the municipality Satow, Germany in the Landkreis Rostock in Mecklenburg-Vorpommern
 a district of the municipality Morsbach in the Oberbergischer Kreis in North Rhine-Westphalia
 a district of the municipality Much, Germany in the Rhein-Sieg-Kreis in North Rhine-Westphalia
 "Siedlung Reinshagen", a company town in Wuppertal
 an abandoned village at Adelebsen, also called Reynhardeshagen